In mathematics, the Stieltjes transformation  of a measure of density  on a real interval  is the function of the complex variable  defined outside  by the formula

Under certain conditions we can reconstitute the density function  starting from its Stieltjes transformation thanks to the inverse formula of Stieltjes-Perron. For example, if the density  is continuous throughout , one will have inside this interval

Connections with moments of measures

If the measure of density  has moments of any order defined for each integer by the equality

then the Stieltjes transformation of  admits for each integer  the asymptotic expansion in the neighbourhood of infinity given by

Under certain conditions the complete expansion as a Laurent series can be obtained:

Relationships to orthogonal polynomials

The correspondence   defines an inner product on the space of continuous functions on the interval .

If  is a sequence of orthogonal polynomials for this product, we can create the sequence of associated secondary polynomials by the formula

Since these two sequences of polynomials satisfy the same recurrence relation in three terms, we can develop a continued fraction for the Stieltjes transformation whose successive convergents are the fractions .

The Stieltjes transformation can also be used to construct from the density  an effective measure for transforming the secondary polynomials into an orthogonal system. (For more details see the article secondary measure.)

See also

 Orthogonal polynomials
 Secondary polynomials
 Secondary measure

References

Integral transforms
Continued fractions